Lloyd Hill (born January 16, 1971) is a former American football wide receiver. He played football collegiately at Texas Tech, where he was named a First-team All-American before being drafted in the sixth round of the 1994 NFL Draft by the Chicago Bears. Hill is the older brother of Roy Williams.

References

1971 births
Living people
Place of birth missing (living people)
American football wide receivers
Texas Tech Red Raiders football players
All-American college football players
Chicago Bears players
Texas Terror players
Houston ThunderBears players
New England Sea Wolves players